The 1940 Mitropa Cup was the 14th edition of the Mitropa Cup and the last season played before the competition was interrupted by the Second World War. The competition would be resumed after the war under the name Zentropa Cup but by that time it was overshadowed by the newly formed European Cup which included teams from all parts of Europe. Last season's champions Újpest were eliminated at the quarter-final stage of the competition. This edition is notable for being the first edition in which a team from Romania reached the final. Rapid București of Romania beat Hungária FC MTK Budapest of Hungary in the quarterfinals and got past Građanski of Yugoslavia in the semi-finals to get to the finals in which they were to play Ferencváros. The final was cancelled due to the Second World War.

Eight teams participated in the competition with Hungary and Yugoslavia each sending three teams and Romania sending two. However Czechoslovakia and Italy did not participate because of the war.

Quarterfinals

|}

Semifinals

|}

Play-off

|}
a Match decided by play off.
b Match decided by coin toss.

Finals

The final between Rapid București and Ferencváros was scheduled to take place in July 1940. However, due to the events of World War II it was cancelled.

Top goalscorers

Notes

References
Dunmore, Thomas (2011). Historical Dictionary of Soccer. Scarecrow Press.

External links 
 Mitropa Cup results at Rec.Sport.Soccer Statistics Foundation

1939-40
1939–40 in European football
1939–40 in Romanian football
1939–40 in Yugoslav football
1939–40 in Hungarian football